Eliza S. Craven Green (10 December 1803 – 11 March 1866) was an English poet, writer, and actress.

Biography
Eliza Craven was born in Kirkgate, Leeds, on 10 December 1803. In her youth she spent some time in Douglas, Isle of Man, at the New Theatre on Athol Street as an actor. Subsequently, she lived at Manchester, but she returned to Leeds, where she resided for many years. She married James Green in 1828, at which point she began to publish her poetry not as "Eliza Craven", but as "Eliza Craven Green". 

Her first book was 'A Legend of Mona, a Tale, in two Cantos,' Douglas 1825, 8vo, and her second and last, 'Sea Weeds and Heath Flowers, or Memories of Mona,' Douglas, 1858, 8vo. She was a frequent contributor of poetry and prose sketches to the periodical press. She wrote for the 'Phœnix,' 1828, and the 'Falcon,' 1831, both Manchester magazines; for the 'Oddfellows' Magazine, 1841 and later; for the 'Leeds Intelligencer', 'Le Follet', 'Hogg's Instructor', and 'Chambers's Journal', and contributed to a volume of poems entitled 'The Festive Wreath,' published at Manchester in 1842.

A few years before her death she received a gift from the queen's privy purse.

She died in Leeds on 11 March 1866 and is buried at St Mark's Cemetery, Woodhouse.

References

"Eliza Craven Green" on manxliterature.com (Retrieved 4 February 2015)

External links
The music and text for the poem 'Ellan Vannin'
Sea Weeds and Heath Flowers, or, Memories of Mona available on manxliterature.com

1803 births
1866 deaths
19th-century English poets
19th-century English women writers
Writers from Leeds
English women poets